Nikolett Papp (née: Kiss; born 23 July 1996) is a Hungarian handballer for Siófok KC and the Hungarian national team.

She debuted in the national team on 28 September 2018 against Montenegro.

Her husband is Máté Papp, hungarian football player.

References

External links

1996 births
Living people
Handball players from Budapest
Ferencvárosi TC players (women's handball)
Győri Audi ETO KC players
Hungarian female handball players
Handball players at the 2020 Summer Olympics